Terrible, The Terrible, Le Terrible or El Terrible may refer to:

Ships
HMS Terrible, eight British Royal Navy ships
French ship Le Terrible, sixteen ships of the French Navy
Terrible-class ship of the line, a French Navy class during the Napoleonic era
The Terrible, the ship used by privateer William Death in 1756

People
List of people known as the Terrible
Terrible, ring name of Mexican professional wrestler Damián Gutiérrez Hernández (born 1976)
El Terrible, nickname of Mexican boxer Érik Morales (born 1976)

Places
Terrible Mountain (disambiguation), a list of peaks known as Terrible Mountain or Mount Terrible
Mont Terri, a mountain in Switzerland, known as Mont Terrible during Napoleonic times
Launceston Castle, Cornwall, England, known in the 16th century as Castle Terrible

Entertainment
 "Terrible", a 2022 song by Teenage Joans
 Terrible, the nickname of DC Comics character Dan Turpin
 Dr. Terrible, presenter of the 2001 British anthology TV series Dr. Terrible's House of Horrible

Hotels and casinos
Terrible's Hotel & Casino, Jean, Nevada
Terrible's Hotel & Casino, Paradise, Nevada, now the Silver Sevens

See also
"Terrible" Tommy Ellis (born 1947), NASCAR driver in the 1960s and '70s
Ted Lindsay (born 1925), Canadian retired National Hockey League player often called "Terrible Ted"
Tommy O'Connor (criminal) (c. 1880-1951?), American gangster known as "Terrible Tommy"